Carbajosa de la Sagrada is a municipality in the province of Salamanca, western Spain, part of the autonomous community of Castile-Leon. It is located only  from the city of Salamanca and as of 2016 has a population of 6,790 people.

References

Municipalities in the Province of Salamanca